Gelechia scotinella, the thicket groundling, is a moth of the family Gelechiidae. It was described by Gottlieb August Wilhelm Herrich-Schäffer in 1854 and is found in almost all of Europe. The habitat consists of mature hedgerows and scrubland.

References

External links

Gelechia
Moths described in 1854
Moths of Europe
Taxa named by Gottlieb August Wilhelm Herrich-Schäffer